Nature Nanotechnology is a monthly peer-reviewed scientific journal published by Nature Publishing Group. It was established in October 2006. The editor-in-chief is Fabio Pulizzi. It covers all aspects of nanoscience and nanotechnology.

Abstracting and indexing 
The journal is abstracted and indexed in:

 Chemical Abstracts Service
 Science Citation Index
 Current Contents/Physical, Chemical & Earth Sciences
 Current Contents/Engineering, Computing & Technology
 Index Medicus/MEDLINE/PubMed

According to the Journal Citation Reports, the journal has a 2020 impact factor of 39.213.

References

External links 
 

Nature Research academic journals
Nanotechnology journals
Publications established in 2006
Monthly journals
English-language journals